Le Conquet is a commune in the Finistère department of Brittany in north-western France. This is the westernmost town of mainland France. Only three island towns—Ouessant, Île-Molène and Ile de Sein—are further west. The town is mentioned in the Asterix series books Asterix and the Chieftain's Daughter and Asterix and the Banquet as Gesocribatum.

Geography
Le Conquet is a fishing port in the northwest of Brittany and it is north of the Pointe Saint-Mathieu (commune de Plougonvelin).

Maritime transport
The port of Le Conquet is served by the Penn-ar-Bed ferry company, providing links with Ouessant and the archipelago of Molène throughout the year. From April to September, the Finist'mer company also provides fast links between the port of Le Conquet and Lanildut, and the archipelago of Molene and Ouessant.

History
As he fled from Wales in exile, Henry Tudor landed in Le Conquet rather than France because of a storm that blew his ship off course.

Population
Inhabitants of Le Conquet are called Conquetois in French.

Sights
The tomb of Jean-François Le Gonidec.
Chapel dedicated to Michel Le Nobletz

International relations
Le Conquet is twinned with the town of Llandeilo in Wales.

Economy

Fishing harbour 
As an important crab fishery port, Le Conquet also became an ideal place for catching uncommon species. The fishing port has been managed by the Chambre de commerce et d'industrie de Brest since 2007. In recent years, alongside traditional crab-fishing ships, the fleet has diversified its activities with other ships, which use fishing nets bringing back monkfish, skate, brill, turbot, lobster and the fresh daily catches. However, the crab still remains the symbol of the harbour.

Rescue station SNSM 
The rescue station was inaugurated on March 10, 1867. Nowadays, the rescue station uses an SNSM first-class lifeboat of 14 meters in length. She is modern, unsinkable and self-righting. The SNS 151 La Louve is always anchored in the harbour with two inflatable boats. One of the latter, named Ville du Conquet, is city property and is used for the coastal watch during the summer season.

Sports and leisure
Le Conquet has a dive center named Club Subaquatique.

See also
Communes of the Finistère department

References

External links
 Commune's website
 Cultural Heritage 
 Pictures from Le Conquet

Communes of Finistère